Timur Valeriyovych Miroshnychenko (Ukrainian: Тімур Валерійович Мірошниченко) (born 9 March 1986) is a Ukrainian TV presenter for the channel UA:PBC. He was the host of the Junior Eurovision Song Contest 2009 together with Ani Lorak, and again in 2013 with Zlata Ognevich. Timur also co-hosted the Eurovision Song Contest 2017.

Biography
Miroshnychenko was born on 9 March 1986 in Kyiv. In his years as a student he was a member of KVN student's team.

His TV career began in 2005, when he became a commentator for the Junior Eurovision Song Contest 2005 — the first JESC to broadcast in Ukraine. He went on to become the commentator of the Eurovision Song Contest for Ukraine from 2007, replacing Pavlo Shylko. He has provided commentary of all broadcasts of Eurovision on UA:PBC since then except ones of contests that were presented by him. He also hosted the TV programme Як це? ("How it is?"), also on UA:PBC.

Miroshnychenko has also hosted the Junior Eurovision Song Contest 2013 in Kyiv with Zlata Ognevich, his second time hosting the Junior contest. On 26 February 2017, it was announced that Miroshnychenko would host the Eurovision Song Contest 2017 in Kyiv. He acted as the green room host, with Oleksandr Skichko and Volodymyr Ostapchuk acting as main hosts. It was the first time that the Eurovision Song Contest was presented by a male trio, and the second time, after the 1956 edition with a solo male presenter, that the contest did not feature a female presenter. 

In October 2022, he presented an award at the 27th National Television Awards held in London. Miroshnychenko will co-host alongside Sam Quek for the Opening Ceremony of the 2023 contest in Liverpool and will act as a Eurovision Correspondent, appearing in VT inserts during the three live shows in addition to his usual role as commentator for the Ukrainian broadcaster.

See also
List of Junior Eurovision Song Contest presenters
List of Eurovision Song Contest presenters
Ukraine in the Eurovision Song Contest

References

External links

Television presenters from Kyiv
Living people
1986 births